This is a list of seasons completed by the Bowling Green State University Falcons men's ice hockey team.  The list documents the season-by-season records of the Falcons from 1969 to present, including conference and national post season records.

Bowling Green has won one NCAA Men's Division I Ice Hockey Championships (1984). In their history the Falcons have made appearances in nine NCAA tournaments (1977, 1978, 1979, 1982, 1984, 1987, 1988, 1989, 1990), including two Frozen Four appearances in 1978 and 1984.  The Falcons have been named the MCHA and the CCHA's regular season champion a combined nine times and won five conference tournament.

Record

* Winning percentage is used when conference schedules are unbalanced.

Footnotes

References

 
Lists of college men's ice hockey seasons in the United States
Bowling Green Falcons ice hockey seasons